Tracey Morton-Rodgers (born 18 December 1967) is a former professional tennis player from Australia. Her maiden name is Morton and she began competing as Morton-Rodgers in 1994

Career
Morton, who comes from Queensland, was most successful as a doubles player, reaching the world's top 100. She was runner-up at the 1989 Fernleaf Classic held in Wellington, partnering Heidi Sprung. In addition she made the semi-finals of a further seven WTA Tour tournaments.

Grand Slam
Morton featured in the women's doubles draws at all four grand slam tournaments, with her partners including Jenny Byrne, Nana Smith, Karin Kschwendt, Anne Minter, Kerry-Ann Guse and Alexandra Fusai. All of her third round appearance came when partnering with British player Clare Wood. It was Wood who beat her when she made the singles draw as a qualifier at the 1989 Wimbledon Championships. Her other two grand slam singles main draws were as a wildcard at the Australian Open, the first in 1990, where she lost to fourth seed and eventual semi-finalist Helena Suková in the opening round. At the 1991 Australian Open she took Jo Durie to three sets in another first round loss. She made the mixed doubles quarter-finals at the 1991 French Open paired with David Macpherson.

WTA Tour finals

Doubles (0-1)

ITF finals

Singles (1–3)

Doubles (3–8)

References

External links
 
 

1967 births
Living people
Australian female tennis players
Tennis people from Queensland
20th-century Australian women